The 2013 Georgia State Panthers softball team represented Georgia State University in the 2013 NCAA Division I softball season. The Panthers competed in the Colonial Athletic Association and were led by then third-year head coach Roger Kincaid. Georgia State played its home games at the Robert E. Heck Softball Complex in Panthersville, Georgia.

Roster

Schedule 

! style="background:#0000FF;color:white;"| Regular Season
|- valign="top" 

|- align="center" bgcolor="#ffccc"
| 1 || February 8 ||  || Starkville, MS || 3-5 || 0-1 || -
|- align="center" bgcolor="#ccffcc"
| 2 || February 8 ||   || Starkville, MS || 10-9 || 1-1 || -
|- align="center" bgcolor="#ffccc"
| 3 || February 9 ||   || Starkville, MS || 1-9 || 1-2 || -
|- align="center" bgcolor="#ffccc"
| 4 || February 9 ||   || Starkville, MS || 0-8 || 1-3 || -
|- align="center" bgcolor="#ffffff"
| - || February 10 ||  Southern Illinois-Edwardsville || Starkville, MS || cancelled || 1-3 || -
|- align="center" bgcolor="#ffffff"
| - || February 10 ||   || Starkville, MS || cancelled || 1-3 || -
|- align="center" bgcolor="#ccffcc"
| 5 || February 17 ||   || Bob Heck Field || 10-0 || 2-3 || -
|- align="center" bgcolor="#ffccc"
| 6 || February 16 ||   || Bob Heck Field || 15-16 || 2-4 || -
|- align="center" bgcolor="#ccffcc"
| 7 || February 17 ||  Northern Kentucky || Bob Heck Field || 8-2 || 3-4 || -
|- align="center" bgcolor="#ccffcc"
| 8 || February 17 ||   || Bob Heck Field || 11-2 || 4-4 || -
|- align="center" bgcolor="#ccffcc"
| 9 || February 20 ||   || Auburn, AL || 4-1 || 5-4 || -
|- align="center" bgcolor="#ffccc"
| 10 || February 23 ||   || Bob Heck Field || 7-8 || 5-5 || -
|- align="center" bgcolor="#ffccc"
| 11 || February 23 ||   || Bob Heck Field || 0-2 || 5-6 || -
|- align="center" bgcolor="#ccffcc"
| 12 || February 24 ||   || Bob Heck Field || 5-1 || 6-6 || -
|- align="center" bgcolor="#ffccc"
| 13 || February 24 ||  Troy || Bob Heck Field || 7-8 || 6-7 || -
|- align="center" bgcolor="#ccffcc"
| 14 || February 27 ||   || Macon, GA || 5-0 || 7-7 || -
|- align="center" bgcolor="#ccffcc"
| 15 || February 27 || Mercer|| Macon, GA || 9-6 || 8-7 || -
|-

|- align="center" bgcolor="#ccffcc"
| 16 || March 1 ||   || Tampa, FL || 3-1 || 9-7 || -
|- align="center" bgcolor="#ccffcc"
| 17 || March 1 ||   || Tampa, FL || 11-1 || 10-7 || -
|- align="center" bgcolor="#ccffcc"
| 18 || March 2 ||  || Tampa, FL || 9-3 || 11-7 || -
|- align="center" bgcolor="#ccffcc"
| 19 || March 2 ||   || Tampa, FL || 3-2 || 12-7 || -
|- align="center" bgcolor="#ffccc"
| 20 || March 3 ||  || Tampa, FL || 9-3 || 12-8 || -
|- align="center" bgcolor="#ccffcc"
| 21 || March 7 ||   || Bob Heck Field || 6-5 || 13-8 || -
|- align="center" bgcolor="#ccffcc"
| 22 || March 7 ||  Eastern Illinois || Bob Heck Field || 4-3 || 14-8 || -
|- align="center" bgcolor="#ccffcc"
| 23 || March 19 ||  Jacksonville State || Bob Heck Field || 11-3 || 15-8 || -
|- align="center" bgcolor="#ffccc"
| 24 || March 20 ||   || Tuscaloosa, AL || 1-9 || 15-9 || -
|- align="center" bgcolor="#ccffcc"
| 25 || March 23 ||   || Bob Heck Field || 5-0 || 16-9 || 1-0
|- align="center" bgcolor="#ccffcc"
| 26 || March 23 ||  George Mason || Bob Heck Field || 7-4 || 17-9 || 2-0
|- align="center" bgcolor="#ccffcc"
| 27 || March 24 || George Mason  || Bob Heck Field || 2-1 || 18-9 || 3-0
|- align="center" bgcolor="#ccffcc"
| 28 || March 26 ||    || Bob Heck Field || 1-0 || 19-9 || 3-0
|- align="center" bgcolor="#ccffcc"
| 29 || March 27 ||  || Chattanooga, TN || 3-1 || 20-9 || 3-0
|- align="center" bgcolor="#ccffcc"
| 30 || March 29 ||  || Hempstead, NY || 3-2 || 21-9 || 4-0
|- align="center" bgcolor="#ffccc"
| 31 || March 29 ||  Hofstra || Hempstead, NY || 1-7 || 21-10 || 4-1
|- align="center" bgcolor="#ffccc"
| 32 || March 30 ||  Hofstra || Hempstead, NY || 1-2 || 21-11 || 4-2
|-

|- align="center" bgcolor="#ccffcc"
| 33 || April 2 ||  Kennesaw State || Kennesaw, GA || 7-3 || 22-11 || 4-2
|- align="center" bgcolor="#ffccc"
| 34 || April 3 ||   || Bob Heck Field || 2-6 || 22-12 || 4-2
|- align="center" bgcolor="#ccffcc"
| 35 || April 3 ||  Furman || Bob Heck Field || 3-1 || 23-12 || 4-2
|- align="center" bgcolor="#ffccc"
| 36 || April 6 ||   || Towson, MD || 1-2 || 23-13 || 4-3
|- align="center" bgcolor="#ccffcc"
| 37 || April 6 ||  Towson || Towson, MD || 5-2 || 24-13 || 5-3
|- align="center" bgcolor="#ffccc"
| 38 || April 7 ||  Towson || Towson, MD ||3-4 || 24-14 || 5-4
|- align="center" bgcolor="#ccffcc"
| 39 || April 10 ||   || Bob Heck Field || 8-0 || 25-14 || 5-4
|- align="center" bgcolor="#ffccc"
| 40 || April 10 ||  Georgia Southern || Bob Heck Field || 4-5 || 25-15 || 5-4
|- align="center" bgcolor="#ccffcc"
| 41 || April 13 ||   || Bob Heck Field || 8-2 || 26-15 || 6-4
|- align="center" bgcolor="#ffccc"
| 42 || April 13 ||  UNC Wilmington || Bob Heck Field || 2-4 || 26-16 || 6-5
|- align="center" bgcolor="#ccffcc"
| 43 || April 14 ||  UNC Wilmington || Bob Heck Field || 1-0 || 27-16 || 7-5
|- align="center" bgcolor="#ccffcc"
| 44 || April 18 ||   || Bob Heck Field || 3-1 || 28-16 || 7-5
|- align="center" bgcolor="#ccffcc"
| 45 || April 18 || Samford || Bob Heck Field || 6-4 || 29-16 || 7-5
|- align="center" bgcolor="#ccffcc"
| 46 || April 20 ||    || Philadelphia, PA || 7-6 || 30-16 || 8-5
|- align="center" bgcolor="#ccffcc"
| 47 || April 20 ||  Drexel || Philadelphia, PA || 9-0 || 31-16 || 9-5
|- align="center" bgcolor="#ccffcc"
| 48 || April 21 ||  Drexel || Philadelphia, PA || 9-0 || 32-16 || 10-5
|- align="center" bgcolor="#ccffcc"
| 49 || April 24 ||   || Athens, GA || 10-7 || 33-16 || 10-5
|- align="center" bgcolor="#ccffcc"
| 50 || April 27 ||  || Bob Heck Field || 6-5 || 34-16 || 11-5
|- align="center" bgcolor="#ccffcc"
| 51 || April 27 ||  Delaware || Bob Heck Field || 8-0 || 35-16 || 12-5
|- align="center" bgcolor="#ccffcc"
| 52 || April 28 ||  Delaware || Bob Heck Field || 6-4 || 36-16 || 13-5
|-

|- align="center" bgcolor="#ffccc"
| 53 || May 3 ||  || Harrisonburg, VA || 3-7 || 36-17 || 13-6
|- align="center" bgcolor="#ffccc"
| 54 || May 3 ||  James Madison || Harrisonburg, VA || 4-5 || 36-18 || 13-7
|- align="center" bgcolor="#ffccc"
| 55 || May 4 ||  James Madison || Harrisonburg, VA || 0-8 || 36-19 || 13-8
|-

References 

2013 NCAA Division I softball season
Georgia State Panthers softball seasons